The Best of Andy Williams is a compilation album by American pop singer Andy Williams that was released by Dino Entertainment in 1992.

The album first appeared on the UK album chart on November 7 of that year and remained there for three weeks, peaking at number 51.

Track listing

 "Moon River" from Breakfast at Tiffany's (Henry Mancini, Johnny Mercer) – 2:46
 "(Where Do I Begin) Love Story" (Francis Lai, Carl Sigman) – 3:10
 "Almost There" from I'd Rather Be Rich  (Jerry Keller, Gloria Shayne) – 2:59
 "Days of Wine and Roses" from Days of Wine and Roses (Henry Mancini, Johnny Mercer) – 2:48
 "Can't Get Used to Losing You" (Jerome "Doc" Pomus, Mort Shuman) – 2:25
 "Solitaire" (Phil Cody, Neil Sedaka) - 4:22
 "Can't Take My Eyes Off You" (Bob Crewe, Bob Gaudio) – 3:15
 "Feelings" (Morris Albert) – 2:56
 "The Look of Love" from Casino Royale (Burt Bacharach, Hal David) – 2:55
 "May Each Day" from The Andy Williams Show (Mort Green, George Wyle) – 2:54
 "Can't Help Falling in Love" (George Weiss, Hugo Peretti, Luigi Creatore) – 3:15
 "The Way We Were" from The Way We Were (Alan Bergman, Marilyn Bergman, Marvin Hamlisch) - 3:18
 "Speak Softly Love (Love Theme from 'The Godfather')" (Larry Kusik, Nino Rota) – 3:05
 "A Man and a Woman" from A Man and a Woman (Pierre Barouh, Jerry Keller, Francis Lai) – 2:50
 "Here, There and Everywhere" (John Lennon, Paul McCartney) – 3:15
 "Yesterday When I Was Young" (Charles Aznavour, Herbert Kretzmer) – 3:52
 "Wichita Lineman" (Jimmy Webb) – 2:55
 "Happy Heart" (James Last, Jackie Rae) – 3:15
 "Butterfly" (Bernie Lowe, Kal Mann) – 2:21
 "Home Lovin' Man" (Roger Cook, Roger Greenaway, Tony Macaulay) – 3:10
 "Misty" (Erroll Garner, Johnny Burke) – 3:24
 "Born Free" from Born Free (Don Black, John Barry) – 2:27

References

1992 compilation albums
Andy Williams compilation albums